Peter Warren (born 1960) is an English technology and investigative journalist for various newspapers, most notably The Guardian and Sunday Times. He frequently appears on national TV and radio and has provided evidence and advice on request to the UK Government and the House of Lords. Warren specialises in technology, undercover investigations, and science issues. He is the former technology editor of Scotland on Sunday and the Sunday Express and a former associate producer for the BBC2 Sci Files series.

Career
In 1991, Warren reported on Kuwait and Iraq for the Guardian newspaper during Kuwait's liberation in the first Gulf War and has reported from places as diverse as Taiwan, Romania, Argentina, the Philippines and the Kalahari Desert.

A frequent reporter for the Sunday Times Insight team, Warren has also worked for the Sunday Times Magazine, most notably on the magazine cover story investigation into the illegal drug culture in Moss Side in Manchester in March 1993.

In 1996, Warren was runner-up in the UK Press Gazette Business Awards for Technology Scoop of the Year. A guest speaker on Technology Ethics to the European Union’s Information Society Technologies conference in 1999 in Helsinki he is now a frequent speaker at conferences and events and now organises the annual Professor Donald Michie Conference on AI with Cooley the world's largest law firm and the Institution of Engineering Technology. Warren, who lives in Suffolk, is an acknowledged expert on computer security issues and is also recognized within the technology industry for his foresight. Warren was one of the UK’s first journalists to stress the issues raised by computer viruses and the need to address the threat of computer crime in the late 80s, a topic that Warren has been a noted campaigner on since that time. His writing on the topic has won a number of prizes.

Warren is now the director of two technology websites, Cyber Security Research Institute and Future Intelligence.

Biography
Peter Warren was born in Harlow, Essex. Warren went on to work for Computer Talk after being educated at Newport Grammar School and Northumbria University. After Computer Talk he went on to write for the Sunday Times, The Guardian, Daily Express, Scotland on Sunday, the Sunday Herald, Mail on Sunday, Daily Mirror, Evening Standard, Sunday Business, Sunday Express and other specialist magazines. He has also appeared in documentaries with Channel 4, the BBC and Sky News. Warren is a regular commentator on cybercrime issues for Sky News.

Warren has won many awards in his area. In 2006, Warren won the BT IT Security News story of the year prize for his work exposing the practice of discarding computer hard drives containing sensitive business and personal data. Then in 2007, Warren won the IT Security News story of the year prize again for work done with Future Intelligence showing that Chinese hackers had broken into the UK Houses of Parliament. In 2008 Warren won the BT Enigma Award for services to technology security journalism.

A campaigning journalist, Warren also wrote the first articles highlighting the potential for the emerging internet to be abused by paedophiles in 1989 and as a result was asked to brief the first UK police force to respond to the danger, the Greater Manchester Police Obscene Publications Squad, on the issues the technology has produced.

In 2005, with Michael Streeter, Warren wrote the critically acclaimed book, Cyber Alert, which accurately predicted the computer security situation the world is now dealing with.

Since 2009, Warren has worked on the creation of the Cyber Security Research Institute, an organisation pulling together the UK’s top academic and business experts in the field of computer security with leading journalists in a bid to raise awareness of cybercrime.

From 2012, Warren has worked as the presenter on the ground breaking PassW0rd radio show on London's ResonanceFM, an hour long monthly programme on the ramifications of technology that he has developed with the veteran radio producer Jane Whyatt.

In 2013, Warren once again collaborated with Michael Streeter to write Cyber crime and warfare published by Hodder and Stoughton another critically acclaimed book on cybercrime.

In 2014, Warren, Streeter and Jane Whyatt produced a report for the European think tank Netopia entitled Can We Make the Digital World Ethical? which was presented to the European Union and subsequently led to an invitation from the French Senate to give a speech to it.

Since 2014, Warren has made a number of highly successful films on the issues raised by technology a number of which have led to great media interest. One, the Herod Clause - which was publicly endorsed by Europol - went viral on the internet and resulted in over a million downloads of virtual private network software from the cyber security company F-Secure.

Peter Warren was one of the first people to raise concerns about the issues that AI will present, and in 2014 he was the lead writer of ‘Can We Make the Digital World Ethical’ for the European technology think tank Netopia which was presented to the EU. As a result of the EU presentation, Warren was asked to give a presentation to the French Senate on technology ethics. The speech was very well received, with DeepMind collaborator Professor Murray Shanahan, Professor of Cognitive Robotics at Imperial College (who also gave evidence to the French Senate) calling for it to be published. DeepMind, now owned by Google is one of the world’s leading AI companies.
In 2017 Warren was asked to organise a series of conferences to discuss the ramifications of AI by Cooley LLP, one of the world’s 50 largest law firms, which includes Google and Microsoft among its many clients. The conferences are held jointly between Future Intelligence, Cooley and the Institution of Engineering Technology and are now named after Professor Donald Michie, one of the fathers of AI, who originated the concept with Alan Turing over games of chess while cracking the Enigma Code during the Second World War.
Warren was asked to submit evidence to the House of Lords Select Committee on AI which re-opened its investigation into the ethics of AI technology after attending Warren’s first conference in 2018.
Warren has now been asked to provide advice to the House of Lords on technology ethics and is currently writing a book on the issues for Bloomsbury which is intended to lay down ethical ground rules and discuss ways of possibly regulating the technology.

Warren has supplied information on cyber security at the request of Graham Wright in Wright's former role as Deputy Director of the Office of Cyber Security in the Cabinet Office. Warren is currently working on a number of books and TV projects.

References

English male journalists
Living people
1960 births
English male non-fiction writers
People from Harlow
Alumni of Newcastle University
People educated at Newport Free Grammar School